Chirocephalus is a genus of fairy shrimp in the family Chirocephalidae. It contains the following species:

Chirocephalus algidus Cottarelli et al., 2010
Chirocephalus anatolicus Cottarelli, Mura & Özkütük, 2007
Chirocephalus appendicularis Vavra, 1905
Chirocephalus baikalensis (Naganawa & Orgiljanova, 2000)
Chirocephalus bairdi (Brauer, 1877)
Chirocephalus bobrinskii (Alcock, 1898)
Chirocephalus brevipalpis (Orghidan, 1953)
Chirocephalus brteki Cottarelli et al., 2010
Chirocephalus carnuntanus (Brauer, 1877)
Chirocephalus chyzeri Daday, 1890
Chirocephalus croaticus Steuer, 1899
Chirocephalus cupreus Cottarelli, Mura & Özkütük, 2007
Chirocephalus diaphanus Prévost, 1803
Chirocephalus festae Colosi, 1922
Chirocephalus hardingi Brtek, 1965
Chirocephalus horribilis Smirnov, 1948
Chirocephalus jaxartensis (Smirnov, 1948)
Chirocephalus josephinae (Grube, 1853)
Chirocephalus kerkyrensis Pesta, 1936
Chirocephalus longicornis (Smirnov, 1930)
Chirocephalus ludmilae Vekhoff, 1992
Chirocephalus marchesonii Ruffo & Vesentini, 1957
Chirocephalus mongolianus Uéno, 1940
Chirocephalus murai Brtek & Cottarelli, 2006
Chirocephalus nankinensis (Shen, 1933)
Chirocephalus neumanni Hartland-Rowe, 1967
Chirocephalus orghidani Brtek, 1966
Chirocephalus paphlagonicus Cottarelli, 1971
Chirocephalus pelagonicus Petkovski, 1986
Chirocephalus ponticus Beladjal & Mertens, 1997
Chirocephalus povolnyi Brtek, 1967
Chirocephalus priscus (Daday, 1910)
Chirocephalus recticornis (Brauer, 1877)
Chirocephalus reiseri Marcus, 1913
Chirocephalus ripophilus (Lepeschkin, 1921)
Chirocephalus robustus G. I. Müller, 1966
Chirocephalus ruffoi Cottarelli & Mura, 1984
Chirocephalus salinus Daday, 1910
Chirocephalus shadini (Smirnov, 1928)
Chirocephalus sibyllae Cottarelli & Mura, 1975
Chirocephalus sinensis Thiele, 1907
Chirocephalus skorikowi Daday, 1912
Chirocephalus slovacicus Brtek, 1971
Chirocephalus soulukliensis Rogers & Soufi, 2013
Chirocephalus spinicaudatus Simon, 1886
Chirocephalus tauricus Pesta, 1921
Chirocephalus tereki Brtek, 1984
Chirocephalus turkestanicus Daday, 1910
Chirocephalus vornatscheri Brtek, 1968
Chirocephalus wangi Hsü, 1933
Chirocephalus weisigi Smirnov, 1933

References

External links

Anostraca
Branchiopoda genera
Taxonomy articles created by Polbot